Juan Lacot Feliú was Mayor of the city of Ponce from 1 September 1848 to 30 September 1849.

Biography
Lacot Feliú was born in Catalunya, Spain, ca. 1816.  He was a businessman in Barrio Playa in Ponce, Puerto Rico, where he also resided.

Mayoral term
During the pandemic of 1855 in Puerto Rico, Lacot lent one of his homes in Barrio Playa for the lodging of residents infected with the cholera bacterium. Juan Lacot was mayor of Ponce when the town received its charter as a villa by the Spanish Crown on 29 July 1848.

Family life
His wife was Matilde Martinez Caraballo and they had three children: Elisa, Juan, and Jose.

References

See also

List of Puerto Ricans
List of mayors of Ponce, Puerto Rico

Mayors of Ponce, Puerto Rico
Year of birth uncertain
1810s births
1866 deaths